The pygmy shrew tenrec (Microgale parvula) is a species of placental mammal in the family Tenrecidae. It is endemic to Madagascar. Its natural habitat is subtropical or tropical moist forests. While it is not endangered, its population is slowly declining as it is threatened by habitat loss. This is of concern, though does not yet merit a higher protection level.

Habitat and Diet
This tenrec has a far-reaching habitat that stretches from the southern part of the island of Madagascar to the northern peninsula, making it one of the only rodent-like creatures to live in this particular part of the island where species diversity is reduced. It is restricted to intact forest areas for the most part and has an altitude range of between 100 and 1,990 m asl. Like most other tenrecs, the pygmy shrew tenrec is an insectivore, making its diet out of Madagascar's numerous bug and insect species.

History

The species was catalogued by G. Grandidier in 1934. While the exact parameters of the species and its populations were unknown until the mid 1990s, it was listed as "Endangered" in 1996 when scientists found sufficient data to back up the category. This was recently redacted and changed to "Least Concern" in 2006.

Behavior

The pygmy shrew tenrec is a nocturnal hunter, using its keen senses of sight and hearing to find and capture prey. While it may also use scent to find the delicious insects it feasts on, this tiny mammal prefers to utilize the night vision evolution has granted it. Shrew tenrecs in general tend to have very large auditory structures and the pygmy shrew tenrec is no different. Large, swiveling ears listen intently for the minute sounds of insects nearby and diminutive but sharp teeth lash out to capture the tasty morsel.

Like most mammals, this tenrec is polygynous, meaning males mate with two or more females. This is to promote successful and plentiful offspring production. It is still unknown whether sexual selection occurs through male on male competition or through female choice, though given its relations' ways of choosing a mate, it can be assumed that it is done through female choice. Now, the question is simply, what makes the females of this species"go wild"?

References

Afrosoricida
Mammals of Madagascar
Mammals described in 1934
Taxonomy articles created by Polbot